Dereköy is a village in Mut district of Mersin Province, Turkey. The headwaters of Kurtsuyu creek and the canyon of Sason are close to the village. The population of the village was 473 as of 2012. The earliest references about the village are dated from 1500. It was then known as Dereli with a population of only 35. Main economic activity of the village is fruit farming. Fruits like apricot and fig are the main crops.

References

Villages in Mut District